Czechoslovakia (Czech and , Česko-Slovensko) was a landlocked country in Central Europe, created in 1918, when it declared its independence from Austria-Hungary. In 1938, after the Munich Agreement, the Sudetenland became part of Germany, while the country lost further territories to Hungary and Poland. Between 1939 and 1945, the state ceased to exist, as Slovakia proclaimed its independence and the remaining territories in the east became part of Hungary, while in the remainder of the Czech Lands, the German Protectorate of Bohemia and Moravia was proclaimed. In 1939, after the outbreak of World War II, former Czechoslovak President Edvard Beneš formed a government-in-exile and sought recognition from the Allies.

After World War II, the pre-1938 Czechoslovakia was reestablished, with the exception of Carpathian Ruthenia, which became part of the Ukrainian SSR (a republic of the Soviet Union). From 1948 to 1989, Czechoslovakia was part of the Eastern Bloc with a command economy. Its economic status was formalized in membership of Comecon from 1949 and its defense status in the Warsaw Pact of 1955. A period of political liberalization in 1968, the Prague Spring, ended violently when the Soviet Union, assisted by other Warsaw Pact countries, invaded Czechoslovakia. In 1989, as Marxist–Leninist governments and communism were ending all over Central and Eastern Europe, Czechoslovaks peacefully deposed their communist government during the Velvet Revolution, which began on 17 November 1989 and ended 7 days later when all of the top Communist leaders resigned. On 31 December 1992, Czechoslovakia peacefully split into the two sovereign states of the Czech Republic and Slovakia as the result of national tensions of the Slovaks.

Characteristics
Form of state
1918–1938: A democratic republic championed by Tomáš Masaryk.
1938–1939: After the acquisition of Sudetenland by Nazi Germany in 1938, the region gradually turned into a state with loosened connections among the Czech, Slovak, and Ruthenian parts. A strip of southern Slovakia and Carpathian Ruthenia was redeemed by Hungary, and the Zaolzie region was annexed by Poland.
1939–1945: The remainder of the state was dismembered and became split into the Protectorate of Bohemia and Moravia and the Slovak Republic, while the rest of Carpathian Ruthenia was occupied and annexed by Hungary. A government-in-exile continued to exist in London, supported by the United Kingdom, United States and their Allies; after the German invasion of Soviet Union, it was also recognized by the Soviet Union. Czechoslovakia adhered to the Declaration by United Nations and was a founding member of the United Nations.
1946–1948: The country was governed by a coalition government with communist ministers, including the prime minister and the minister of interior. Carpathian Ruthenia was ceded to the Soviet Union.
1948–1989: The country became a Marxist-Leninist state under Soviet domination with a command economy. In 1960, the country officially became a socialist republic, the Czechoslovak Socialist Republic. It was a satellite state of the Soviet Union.
1989–1990: Czechoslovakia formally became a federal republic comprising the Czech Socialist Republic and the Slovak Socialist Republic. In late 1989, the communist rule came to an end during the Velvet Revolution followed by the re-establishment of a democratic parliamentary republic.
1990–1992: Shortly after the Velvet Revolution, the state was renamed the Czech and Slovak Federative Republic, consisting of the Czech Republic and the Slovak Republic (Slovakia) until the peaceful dissolution on 31 December 1992.

Neighbors
Austria 1918–1938, 1945–1992
Germany (both predecessors, West Germany and East Germany, were neighbors between 1949 and 1990)
Hungary
Poland
Romania 1918–1938
Soviet Union 1945–1991
Ukraine 1991–1992 (Soviet Union member until 1991)
Topography
The country was of generally irregular terrain. The western area was part of the north-central European uplands. The eastern region was composed of the northern reaches of the Carpathian Mountains and lands of the Danube River basin.

Climate
The weather is mild winters and mild summers. Influenced by the Atlantic Ocean from the west, the Baltic Sea from the north, and Mediterranean Sea from the south. There is no continental weather.

Names

1918–1938: Czechoslovak Republic (abbreviated ČSR), or Czechoslovakia, before the formalization of the name in 1920, also known as Czecho-Slovakia or the Czecho-Slovak state
1938–1939: Czecho-Slovak Republic, or Czecho-Slovakia
1945–1960: Czechoslovak Republic (ČSR), or Czechoslovakia
1960–1989: Czechoslovak Socialist Republic (ČSSR), or Czechoslovakia
1990–1992: Czech and Slovak Federative Republic (ČSFR), or Czechoslovakia

History

Origins

The area was part of the Austro-Hungarian Empire until it collapsed at the end of World War I. The new state was founded by Tomáš Garrigue Masaryk, who served as its first president from 14 November 1918 to 14 December 1935. He was succeeded by his close ally Edvard Beneš (1884–1948).

The roots of Czech nationalism go back to the 19th century, when philologists and educators, influenced by Romanticism, promoted the Czech language and pride in the Czech people. Nationalism became a mass movement in the second half of the 19th century. Taking advantage of the limited opportunities for participation in political life under Austrian rule, Czech leaders such as historian František Palacký (1798–1876) founded various patriotic, self-help organizations which provided a chance for many of their compatriots to participate in communal life before independence. Palacký supported Austro-Slavism and worked for a reorganized federal Austrian Empire, which would protect the Slavic speaking peoples of Central Europe against Russian and German threats.

An advocate of democratic reform and Czech autonomy within Austria-Hungary, Masaryk was elected twice to the Reichsrat (Austrian Parliament), from 1891 to 1893 for the Young Czech Party, and from 1907 to 1914 for the Czech Realist Party, which he had founded in 1889 with Karel Kramář and Josef Kaizl.

During World War I a number of Czechs and Slovaks, the Czechoslovak Legions, fought with the Allies in France and Italy, while large numbers deserted to Russia in exchange for its support for the independence of Czechoslovakia from the Austrian Empire. With the outbreak of World War I, Masaryk began working for Czech independence in a union with Slovakia. With Edvard Beneš and Milan Rastislav Štefánik, Masaryk visited several Western countries and won support from influential publicists. The Czechoslovak National Council was the main organization that advanced the claims for a Czechoslovak state.

First Czechoslovak Republic

Formation

The Bohemian Kingdom ceased to exist in 1918 when it was incorporated into Czechoslovakia. Czechoslovakia was founded in October 1918, as one of the successor states of the Austro-Hungarian Empire at the end of World War I and as part of the Treaty of Saint-Germain-en-Laye. It consisted of the present day territories of Bohemia, Moravia, Slovakia and Carpathian Ruthenia. Its territory included some of the most industrialized regions of the former Austria-Hungary. "The land consisted of modern day Czechia, Slovakia, and a region of Ukraine called Carpathian Ruthnia

Ethnicity 

The new country was a multi-ethnic state, with Czechs and Slovaks as constituent peoples. The population consisted of Czechs (51%), Slovaks (16%), Germans (22%), Hungarians (5%) and Rusyns (4%). Many of the Germans, Hungarians, Ruthenians and Poles and some Slovaks, felt oppressed because the political elite did not generally allow political autonomy for minority ethnic groups. This policy led to unrest among the non-Czech population, particularly in German-speaking Sudetenland, which initially had proclaimed itself part of the Republic of German-Austria in accordance with the self-determination principle.

The state proclaimed the official ideology that there were no separate Czech and Slovak nations, but only one nation of Czechoslovaks (see Czechoslovakism), to the disagreement of Slovaks and other ethnic groups. Once a unified Czechoslovakia was restored after World War II (after the country had been divided during the war), the conflict between the Czechs and the Slovaks surfaced again. The governments of Czechoslovakia and other Central European nations deported ethnic Germans, reducing the presence of minorities in the nation. Most of the Jews had been killed during the war by the Nazis.

*Jews identified themselves as Germans or Hungarians (and Jews only by religion not ethnicity), the sum is, therefore, more than 100%.

Interwar period 
During the period between the two world wars Czechoslovakia was a democratic state. The population was generally literate, and contained fewer alienated groups. The influence of these conditions was augmented by the political values of Czechoslovakia's leaders and the policies they adopted. Under Tomas Masaryk, Czech and Slovak politicians promoted progressive social and economic conditions that served to defuse discontent.

Foreign minister Beneš became the prime architect of the Czechoslovak-Romanian-Yugoslav alliance (the "Little Entente", 1921–38) directed against Hungarian attempts to reclaim lost areas. Beneš worked closely with France. Far more dangerous was the German element, which after 1933 became allied with the Nazis in Germany.

Czech-Slovak relations came to be a central issue in Czechoslovak politics during the 1930s. The increasing feeling of inferiority among the Slovaks,  who were hostile to the more numerous Czechs, weakened the country in the late 1930s. Slovakia became autonomous in the fall of 1938, and by mid-1939, Slovakia had become independent, with the First Slovak Republic set up as a satellite state of Nazi Germany and the far-right Slovak People’s Party in power .

After 1933, Czechoslovakia remained the only democracy in central and eastern Europe.

Munich Agreement, and Two-Step German Occupation

In September 1938, Adolf Hitler demanded control of the Sudetenland. On 29 September 1938, Britain and France ceded control in the Appeasement at the Munich Conference; France ignored the military alliance it had with Czechoslovakia. During October 1938, Nazi Germany occupied the Sudetenland border region, effectively crippling Czechoslovak defences.

The First Vienna Award assigned a strip of southern Slovakia and Carpathian Ruthenia to Hungary. Poland occupied Zaolzie, an area whose population was majority Polish, in October 1938.

On 14 March 1939, the remainder ("rump") of Czechoslovakia was dismembered by the proclamation of the Slovak State, the next day the rest of Carpathian Ruthenia was occupied and annexed by Hungary, while the following day the German Protectorate of Bohemia and Moravia was proclaimed.

The eventual goal of the German state under Nazi leadership was to eradicate Czech nationality through assimilation, deportation, and extermination of the Czech intelligentsia; the intellectual elites and middle class made up a considerable number of the 200,000 people who passed through concentration camps and the 250,000 who died during German occupation. Under Generalplan Ost, it was assumed that around 50% of Czechs would be fit for Germanization. The Czech intellectual elites were to be removed not only from Czech territories but from Europe completely. The authors of Generalplan Ost believed it would be best if they emigrated overseas, as even in Siberia they were considered a threat to German rule. Just like Jews, Poles, Serbs, and several other nations, Czechs were considered to be untermenschen by the Nazi state. In 1940, in a secret Nazi plan for the Germanization of the Protectorate of Bohemia and Moravia it was declared that those considered to be of racially Mongoloid origin and the Czech intelligentsia were not to be Germanized.

The deportation of Jews to concentration camps was organized under the direction of Reinhard Heydrich, and the fortress town of Terezín was made into a ghetto way station for Jewish families. On 4 June 1942 Heydrich died after being wounded by an assassin in Operation Anthropoid. Heydrich's successor, Colonel General Kurt Daluege, ordered mass arrests and executions and the destruction of the villages of Lidice and Ležáky. In 1943 the German war effort was accelerated. Under the authority of Karl Hermann Frank, German minister of state for Bohemia and Moravia, some 350,000 Czech laborers were dispatched to the Reich. Within the protectorate, all non-war-related industry was prohibited. Most of the Czech population obeyed quiescently up until the final months preceding the end of the war, while thousands were involved in the resistance movement.

For the Czechs of the Protectorate Bohemia and Moravia, German occupation was a period of brutal oppression. Czech losses resulting from political persecution and deaths in concentration camps totaled between 36,000 and 55,000. The Jewish populations of Bohemia and Moravia (118,000 according to the 1930 census) were virtually annihilated. Many Jews emigrated after 1939; more than 70,000 were killed; 8,000 survived at Terezín. Several thousand Jews managed to live in freedom or in hiding throughout the occupation.

Despite the estimated 136,000 deaths at the hands of the Nazi regime, the population in the Reichsprotektorate saw a net increase during the war years of approximately 250,000 in line with an increased birth rate.

On 6 May 1945, the third US Army of General Patton entered Pilsen from the south west. On 9 May 1945, Soviet Red Army troops entered Prague.

Communist Czechoslovakia

After World War II, pre-war Czechoslovakia was re-established, with the exception of Subcarpathian Ruthenia, which was annexed by the Soviet Union and incorporated into the Ukrainian Soviet Socialist Republic. The Beneš decrees were promulgated concerning ethnic Germans (see Potsdam Agreement) and ethnic Hungarians. Under the decrees, citizenship was abrogated for people of German and Hungarian ethnic origin who had accepted German or Hungarian citizenship during the occupations. In 1948, this provision was cancelled for the Hungarians, but only partially for the Germans. The government then confiscated the property of the Germans and expelled about 90% of the ethnic German population, over 2 million people. Those who remained were collectively accused of supporting the Nazis after the Munich Agreement, as 97.32% of Sudeten Germans had voted for the NSDAP in the December 1938 elections. Almost every decree explicitly stated that the sanctions did not apply to antifascists. Some 250,000 Germans, many married to Czechs, some antifascists, and also those required for the post-war reconstruction of the country, remained in Czechoslovakia. The Beneš Decrees still cause controversy among nationalist groups in the Czech Republic, Germany, Austria and Hungary.

Following the expulsion of the ethnic German population from Czechoslovakia, parts of the former Sudetenland, especially around Krnov and the surrounding villages of the Jesenik mountain region in northeastern Czechoslovakia, were settled in 1949 by Communist refugees from Northern Greece who had left their homeland as a result of the Greek Civil War. These Greeks made up a large proportion of the town and region's population until the late 1980s/early 1990s. Although defined as "Greeks", the Greek Communist community of Krnov and the Jeseniky region actually consisted of an ethnically diverse population, including Greek Macedonians, Macedonians, Vlachs, Pontic Greeks and Turkish speaking Urums or Caucasus Greeks.

Carpathian Ruthenia (Podkarpatská Rus) was occupied by (and in June 1945 formally ceded to) the Soviet Union. In the 1946 parliamentary election, the Communist Party of Czechoslovakia was the winner in the Czech lands, and the Democratic Party won in Slovakia. In February 1948 the Communists seized power. Although they would maintain the fiction of political pluralism through the existence of the National Front, except for a short period in the late 1960s (the Prague Spring) the country had no liberal democracy. Since citizens lacked significant electoral methods of registering protest against government policies, periodically there were street protests that became violent. For example, there were riots in the town of Plzeň in 1953, reflecting economic discontent. Police and army units put down the rebellion, and hundreds were injured but no one was killed. While its economy remained more advanced than those of its neighbors in Eastern Europe, Czechoslovakia grew increasingly economically weak relative to Western Europe.

The currency reform of 1953 caused dissatisfaction among Czechoslovak laborers. To equalize the wage rate, Czechoslovaks had to turn in their old money for new at a decreased value. The banks also confiscated savings and bank deposits to control the amount of money in circulation. In the 1950s, Czechoslovakia experienced high economic growth (averaging 7% per year), which allowed for a substantial increase in wages and living standards, thus promoting the stability of the regime.

In 1968, when the reformer Alexander Dubček was appointed to the key post of First Secretary of the Czechoslovak Communist Party, there was a brief period of liberalization known as the Prague Spring. In response, after failing to persuade the Czechoslovak leaders to change course, five other members of the Warsaw Pact invaded. Soviet tanks rolled into Czechoslovakia on the night of 20–21 August 1968. Soviet Communist Party General Secretary Leonid Brezhnev viewed this intervention as vital for the preservation of the Soviet, socialist system and vowed to intervene in any state that sought to replace Marxism-Leninism with capitalism.

In the week after the invasion there was a spontaneous campaign of civil resistance against the occupation. This resistance involved a wide range of acts of non-cooperation and defiance: this was followed by a period in which the Czechoslovak Communist Party leadership, having been forced in Moscow to make concessions to the Soviet Union, gradually put the brakes on their earlier liberal policies.

Meanwhile, one plank of the reform program had been carried out: in 1968–69, Czechoslovakia was turned into a federation of the Czech Socialist Republic and Slovak Socialist Republic. The theory was that under the federation, social and economic inequities between the Czech and Slovak halves of the state would be largely eliminated. A number of ministries, such as education, now became two formally equal bodies in the two formally equal republics. However, the centralized political control by the Czechoslovak Communist Party severely limited the effects of federalization.

The 1970s saw the rise of the dissident movement in Czechoslovakia, represented among others by Václav Havel. The movement sought greater political participation and expression in the face of official disapproval, manifested in limitations on work activities, which went as far as a ban on professional employment, the refusal of higher education for the dissidents' children, police harassment and prison.

During the 1980s, Czechoslovakia became one of the most tightly controlled Communist regimes in the Warsaw Pact in resistance to the mitigation of controls notified by Soviet president Mikhail Gorbachev.

After 1989

In 1989, the Velvet Revolution restored democracy. This occurred at around the same time as the fall of communism in Romania, Bulgaria, Hungary, East Germany and Poland.

The word "socialist" was removed from the country's full name on 29 March 1990 and replaced by "federal".

Pope John Paul II made a papal visit to Czechoslovakia on 21 April 1990, hailing it as a symbolic step of reviving Christianity in the newly-formed post-communist state.

Czechoslovakia participated in the Gulf War with a small force of 200 troops under the command of the U.S.-led coalition.

In 1992, because of growing nationalist tensions in the government, Czechoslovakia was peacefully dissolved by parliament. On 31 December 1992 it formally separated into two independent countries, the Czech Republic and the Slovak Republic.

Government and politics 

After World War II, a political monopoly was held by the Communist Party of Czechoslovakia (KSČ). The leader of the KSČ was de facto the most powerful person in the country during this period. Gustáv Husák was elected first secretary of the KSČ in 1969 (changed to general secretary in 1971) and president of Czechoslovakia in 1975. Other parties and organizations existed but functioned in subordinate roles to the KSČ. All political parties, as well as numerous mass organizations, were grouped under umbrella of the National Front. Human rights activists and religious activists were severely repressed.

Constitutional development

Czechoslovakia had the following constitutions during its history (1918–1992):
Temporary constitution of 14 November 1918 (democratic): see History of Czechoslovakia (1918–1938)
The 1920 constitution (The Constitutional Document of the Czechoslovak Republic), democratic, in force until 1948, several amendments
The Communist 1948 Ninth-of-May Constitution
The Communist 1960 Constitution of the Czechoslovak Socialist Republic with major amendments in 1968 (Constitutional Law of Federation), 1971, 1975, 1978, and 1989 (at which point the leading role of the Communist Party was abolished). It was amended several more times during 1990–1992 (for example, 1990, name change to Czecho-Slovakia, 1991 incorporation of the human rights charter)

Heads of state and government 

List of presidents of Czechoslovakia
List of prime ministers of Czechoslovakia

Foreign policy

International agreements and membership
In the 1930s, the nation formed a military alliance with France, which collapsed in the Munich Agreement of 1938. After World War II, an active participant in Council for Mutual Economic Assistance (Comecon), Warsaw Pact, United Nations and its specialized agencies; signatory of conference on Security and Cooperation in Europe.

Administrative divisions

1918–1923: Different systems in former Austrian territory (Bohemia, Moravia, a small part of Silesia) compared to former Hungarian territory (Slovakia and Ruthenia): three lands (země) (also called district units (kraje)): Bohemia, Moravia, Silesia, plus 21 counties (župy) in today's Slovakia and three counties in today's Ruthenia; both lands and counties were divided into districts (okresy).
1923–1927: As above, except that the Slovak and Ruthenian counties were replaced by six (grand) counties ((veľ)župy) in Slovakia and one (grand) county in Ruthenia, and the numbers and boundaries of the okresy were changed in those two territories.
1928–1938: Four lands (Czech: země, Slovak: krajiny): Bohemia, Moravia-Silesia, Slovakia and Sub-Carpathian Ruthenia, divided into districts (okresy).
Late 1938 – March 1939: As above, but Slovakia and Ruthenia gained the status of "autonomous lands". Slovakia was called Slovenský štát, with its own currency and government.
1945–1948: As in 1928–1938, except that Ruthenia became part of the Soviet Union.
1949–1960: 19 regions (kraje) divided into 270 okresy.
1960–1992: 10 kraje, Prague, and (from 1970) Bratislava (capital of Slovakia); these were divided into 109–114 okresy; the kraje were abolished temporarily in Slovakia in 1969–1970 and for many purposes from 1991 in Czechoslovakia; in addition, the Czech Socialist Republic and the Slovak Socialist Republic were established in 1969 (without the word Socialist from 1990).

Population and ethnic groups

Economy

Before World War II, the economy was about the fourth in all industrial countries in Europe. The state was based on strong economy, manufacturing cars (Škoda, Tatra), trams, aircraft (Aero, Avia), ships, ship engines (Škoda), cannons, shoes (Baťa), turbines, guns (Zbrojovka Brno). It was the industrial workshop for the Austro-Hungarian empire. The Slovak lands relied more heavily on agriculture than the Czech lands.

After World War II, the economy was centrally planned, with command links controlled by the communist party, similarly to the Soviet Union. The large metallurgical industry was dependent on imports of iron and non-ferrous ores.
Industry: Extractive industry and manufacturing dominated the sector, including machinery, chemicals, food processing, metallurgy, and textiles. The sector was wasteful in its use of energy, materials, and labor and was slow to upgrade technology, but the country was a major supplier of high-quality machinery, instruments, electronics, aircraft, airplane engines and arms to other socialist countries.
Agriculture: Agriculture was a minor sector, but collectivized farms of large acreage and relatively efficient mode of production enabled the country to be relatively self-sufficient in the food supply. The country depended on imports of grains (mainly for livestock feed) in years of adverse weather. Meat production was constrained by a shortage of feed, but the country still recorded high per capita consumption of meat.
Foreign Trade: Exports were estimated at US$17.8 billion in 1985. Exports were machinery (55%), fuel and materials (14%), and manufactured consumer goods (16%). Imports stood at an estimated US$17.9 billion in 1985, including fuel and materials (41%), machinery (33%), and agricultural and forestry products (12%). In 1986, about 80% of foreign trade was with other socialist countries.
Exchange rate: Official, or commercial, the rate was crowns (Kčs) 5.4 per US$1 in 1987. Tourist, or non-commercial, the rate was Kčs 10.5 per US$1. Neither rate reflected purchasing power. The exchange rate on the black market was around Kčs 30 per US$1, which became the official rate once the currency became convertible in the early 1990s.
Fiscal year: Calendar year.
Fiscal policy: The state was the exclusive owner of means of production in most cases. Revenue from state enterprises was the primary source of revenues followed by turnover tax. The government spent heavily on social programs, subsidies, and investment. The budget was usually balanced or left a small surplus.

Resource base

After World War II, the country was short of energy, relying on imported crude oil and natural gas from the Soviet Union, domestic brown coal, and nuclear and hydroelectric energy. Energy constraints were a major factor in the 1980s.

Transport and communications

Slightly after the foundation of Czechoslovakia in 1918, there was a lack of essential infrastructure in many areas – paved roads, railways, bridges, etc. Massive improvement in the following years enabled Czechoslovakia to develop its industry. Prague's civil airport in Ruzyně became one of the most modern terminals in the world when it was finished in 1937. Tomáš Baťa, a Czech entrepreneur and visionary, outlined his ideas in the publication "Budujme stát pro 40 milionů lidí", where he described the future motorway system. Construction of the first motorways in Czechoslovakia begun in 1939, nevertheless, they were stopped after German occupation during World War II.

Society

Education

Education was free at all levels and compulsory from ages 6 to 15. The vast majority of the population was literate. There was a highly developed system of apprenticeship training and vocational schools supplemented general secondary schools and institutions of higher education.

Religion

In 1991, 46% of the population were Roman Catholics, 5.3% were Evangelical Lutheran, 30% were Atheist, and other religions made up 17% of the country, but there were huge differences in religious practices between the two constituent republics; see Czech Republic and Slovakia.

Health, social welfare and housing

After World War II, free health care was available to all citizens. National health planning emphasized preventive medicine; factory and local health care centres supplemented hospitals and other inpatient institutions. There was a substantial improvement in rural health care during the 1960s and 1970s.

Mass media

During the era between the World Wars, Czechoslovak democracy and liberalism facilitated conditions for free publication. The most significant daily newspapers in these times were Lidové noviny, Národní listy, Český deník and Československá Republika.

During Communist rule, the mass media in Czechoslovakia were controlled by the Communist Party. Private ownership of any publication or agency of the mass media was generally forbidden, although churches and other organizations published small periodicals and newspapers. Even with this information monopoly in the hands of organizations under KSČ control, all publications were reviewed by the government's Office for Press and Information.

Sports

The Czechoslovakia national football team was a consistent performer on the international scene, with eight appearances in the FIFA World Cup Finals, finishing in second place in 1934 and 1962. The team also won the European Football Championship in 1976, came in third in 1980 and won the Olympic gold in 1980.

Well-known football players such as Pavel Nedvěd, Antonín Panenka, Milan Baroš, Tomáš Rosický, Vladimír Šmicer or Petr Čech were all born in Czechoslovakia.

The International Olympic Committee code for Czechoslovakia is TCH, which is still used in historical listings of results.

The Czechoslovak national ice hockey team won many medals from the world championships and Olympic Games. Peter Šťastný, Jaromír Jágr, Dominik Hašek, Peter Bondra, Petr Klíma, Marián Gáborík, Marián Hossa, Miroslav Šatan and Pavol Demitra all come from Czechoslovakia.

Emil Zátopek, winner of four Olympic gold medals in athletics, is considered one of the top athletes in Czechoslovak history.

Věra Čáslavská was an Olympic gold medallist in gymnastics, winning seven gold medals and four silver medals. She represented Czechoslovakia in three consecutive Olympics.

Several accomplished professional tennis players including Jaroslav Drobný, Ivan Lendl, Jan Kodeš, Miloslav Mečíř, Hana Mandlíková, Martina Hingis, Martina Navratilova, Jana Novotna, Petra Kvitová and Daniela Hantuchová were born in Czechoslovakia.

Culture
Czech RepublicSlovakia
List of CzechsList of Slovaks
MDŽ (International Women's Day)
Jazz in dissident Czechoslovakia

Postage stamps
Postage stamps and postal history of Czechoslovakia
Czechoslovakia stamp reused by Slovak Republic after 18 January 1939 by overprinting country and value

See also
Effects on the environment in Czechoslovakia from Soviet influence during the Cold War
Former countries in Europe after 1815
List of former sovereign states

Notes

References

Sources

Further reading

Heimann, Mary. Czechoslovakia: The State That Failed (2009). 
Hermann, A. H. A History of the Czechs (1975).
Kalvoda, Josef. The Genesis of Czechoslovakia (1986).
Leff, Carol Skalnick. National Conflict in Czechoslovakia: The Making and Remaking of a State, 1918–87 (1988).
Mantey, Victor. A History of the Czechoslovak Republic (1973).
Myant, Martin. The Czechoslovak Economy, 1948–88 (1989).
Naimark, Norman, and Leonid Gibianskii, eds. The Establishment of Communist Regimes in Eastern Europe, 1944–1949 (1997) online edition
Orzoff, Andrea. Battle for the Castle: The Myth of Czechoslovakia in Europe 1914–1948 (Oxford University Press, 2009); online review  online
Paul, David. Czechoslovakia: Profile of a Socialist Republic at the Crossroads of Europe (1990).
Renner, Hans. A History of Czechoslovakia since 1945 (1989).
Seton-Watson, R. W. A History of the Czechs and Slovaks (1943).
Stone, Norman, and E. Strouhal, eds.Czechoslovakia: Crossroads and Crises, 1918–88 (1989).
Wheaton, Bernard; Zdenek Kavav. "The Velvet Revolution: Czechoslovakia, 1988–1991" (1992).
Williams, Kieran, "Civil Resistance in Czechoslovakia: From Soviet Invasion to "Velvet Revolution", 1968–89",in Adam Roberts and Timothy Garton Ash (eds.), Civil Resistance and Power Politics: The Experience of Non-violent Action from Gandhi to the Present (Oxford University Press, 2009).
Windsor, Philip, and Adam Roberts, Czechoslovakia 1968: Reform, Repression and Resistance (1969).
Wolchik, Sharon L. Czechoslovakia: Politics, Society, and Economics (1990).

External links

Online books and articles
U.S. Library of Congress Country Studies, "Czechoslovakia"
English/Czech: Orders and Medals of Czechoslovakia including Order of the White Lion
Czechoslovakia by Encyclopædia Britannica
 Katrin Boeckh: Crumbling of Empires and Emerging States: Czechoslovakia and Yugoslavia as (Multi)national Countries, in: 1914-1918-online. International Encyclopedia of the First World War.

Maps with Hungarian-language rubrics:
Border changes after the creation of Czechoslovakia
Interwar Czechoslovakia
Czechoslovakia after Munich Agreement

 
Eastern Bloc
Former republics
Soviet satellite states
Geography of Central Europe
History of Central Europe
 
1918 establishments in Czechoslovakia
1939 disestablishments in Czechoslovakia
1945 establishments in Czechoslovakia
1992 disestablishments in Czechoslovakia
States and territories established in 1918
States and territories disestablished in 1939
States and territories established in 1945
States and territories disestablished in 1992
1918 establishments in Europe
1992 disestablishments in Europe
Former member states of the United Nations